The United States Department of Defense acknowledges holding eight Egyptian detainees at Guantanamo Bay.
A total of 778 captives have been held in extrajudicial detention in the Guantanamo Bay detention camps, in Cuba since the camps opened on January 11, 2002
The camp population peaked in 2004 at approximately 660.  Only nineteen new captives, all "high value detainees" have been transferred there since the United States Supreme Court's ruling in Rasul v. Bush.  As of February 24, 2010, the camp population stood at 188.

On February 24, 2010, Carol Rosenberg, of the Miami Herald, reported that Albania accepted the transfer of three former captives, an Egyptian, Sharif Fati Ali al Mishad, and Saleh Bin Hadi Asasi and Rauf Omar Mohammad Abu al Qusin, a Tunisian and a Libyan.
The men will not be allowed to leave Albania.

References

Lists of Guantanamo Bay detainees by nationality
Egypt–United States relations